The Central District of Borujerd County is a district (bakhsh) in Borujerd County, Lorestan Province, Iran. At the 2006 census, its population was 285,179, in 73,528 families.  The District has one city: Borujerd.

References 

Districts of Lorestan Province
Borujerd County